Nikola Shterev (born 13 March 1903 – 27 December 1972) was a Bulgarian international football player and coach. On club level Shterev won one national championship with Botev Plovdiv in 1929.

Career
Shterev started his career at the age of 13 in the little Sport Club Bay Ganyo. In 1917 he relocated to Botev Plovdiv. From 1924 Shterev was a captain and coach of the team.

Shterev retired in 1933 to take up the role of director of the Football school in Plovdiv, a post that he held until his death in 1972. From 1933 to 1945 he also was a football referee.

Bulgarian footballers
1903 births
1972 deaths
Bulgaria international footballers
Botev Plovdiv players

Association football forwards